Tübingen is an electoral constituency (German: Wahlkreis) represented in the Bundestag. It elects one member via first-past-the-post voting. Under the current constituency numbering system, it is designated as constituency 290. It is located in central Baden-Württemberg, comprising the Tübingen district and the northeastern part of the Zollernalbkreis district.

Tübingen was created for the 1980 federal election. Since 2002, it has been represented by Annette Widmann-Mauz of the Christian Democratic Union (CDU).

Geography
Tübingen is located in central Baden-Württemberg. As of the 2021 federal election, it comprises the Tübingen district and the municipalities of Bisingen, Burladingen, Grosselfingen, Hechingen, Jungingen, and Rangendingen from the Zollernalbkreis district.

History
Tübingen was created in 1980. In the 1980 through 1998 elections, it was constituency 194 in the numbering system. In the 2002 and 2005 elections, it was number 291. Since the 2009 election, it has been number 290. Its borders have not changed since its creation.

Members
The constituency has been held by Christian Democratic Union (CDU) during all but one Bundestag term since its creation. It was first represented by Jürgen Todenhöfer from 1980 to 1990, followed by Claus-Peter Grotz from 1990 to 1998. Herta Däubler-Gmelin of the Social Democratic Party (SPD) was elected in 1998 and served one term. Annette Widmann-Mauz has been representative since 2002.

Election results

2021 election

2017 election

2013 election

2009 election

References

Federal electoral districts in Baden-Württemberg
1980 establishments in West Germany
Constituencies established in 1980
Tübingen (district)
Zollernalbkreis